Kaoru Ono (小野 薫, Ono Kaoru, born 1962) is a Japanese mathematician, specializing in symplectic geometry. He is a professor at the Research Institute for Mathematical Sciences (RIMS) at Kyoto University.

Ono received from the University of Tokyo his undergraduate degree in 1984, his master's degree in 1987, and his Ph.D. in 1990. Within symplectic geometry, his research has focused on Floer theory and holomorphic symplectic geometry involving holomorphic curves and pseudoholomorphic curves and their applications. He has collaborated extensively with Kenji Fukaya, Oh Yong-Geun, and Hiroshi Ohta (see Fukaya category).

Ono was awarded by the Mathematical Society of Japan in 1999 the Geometry Prize and in 2005 the Autumn Prize. He was awarded by the Inoue Foundation for Science in February 2007 the Inoue Prize for Science. In 2006 he was an Invited Speaker with talk Development in symplectic Floer theory at the International Congress of Mathematicians in Madrid.

In 2022, he serves as Director of the Research Institute for Mathematical Sciences of Kyoto University (KURIMS).

Selected publications
 On the Arnold conjecture for weakly monotone symplectic manifold, Vol. 119, 1995, pp. 519–537 
 with Fukaya: Arnold conjecture and Gromov-Witten invariant, Topology, Vol. 38, 1999, pp. 933–1048
 with Fukaya: Arnold conjecture and Gromov-Witten invariant for general symplectic manifolds. The Arnoldfest: Proceedings of a Conference in Honour of V.I. Arnold  for his Sixtieth Birthday (Toronto, 1997), 1999, pp. 173–190
 Development in symplectic Floer theory, International Congress of Mathematicians, 2006, Proc. ICM Madrid, Volume 2, 1061–1082
 with Fukaya, Oh, & Ohta:  Lagrangian Intersection Floer Theory . AMS/IP Studies in Advanced Mathematics, 20
 
 
 with Fukaya, Oh, & Ohta: "Technical details on Kuranishi structure and virtual fundamental chain." arXiv preprint arXiv:1209.4410, 2012

References

20th-century Japanese mathematicians
21st-century Japanese mathematicians
Academic staff of Kyoto University
Academic staff of Hokkaido University
University of Tokyo alumni
1962 births
Living people